Duan Zhengcheng (15 June 1934 – 15 February 2020) was a Chinese industrial engineer and inventor. He specialized in machinery manufacturing and automation, was an academician of the Chinese Academy of Engineering (CAE) and served as a professor and doctoral supervisor at the Huazhong University of Science and Technology.

Biography
Duan was born in Zhenjiang, Jiangsu, on 15 June 1934. After graduating from high school in 1953, he studied, then taught, at what is now Huazhong University of Science and Technology. On 15 February 2020, he died of coronavirus disease 2019 (COVID-19) in Wuhan, Hubei, aged 85.

Contribution
In 1996, he invented the OUR-QGD stereotactic gamma-ray system, which won him a State Science and Technology Progress Award (Second Class) in 2005.

Honours and awards
 2003 State Science and Technology Progress Award (Second Class)
 2005 State Science and Technology Progress Award (Second Class)
 2008 State Science and Technology Progress Award (Second Class)
 2009 Member of the Chinese Academy of Engineering (CAE)

References

1934 births
2020 deaths
Chinese industrial engineers
20th-century Chinese inventors
Engineers from Jiangsu
Huazhong University of Science and Technology alumni
Academic staff of Huazhong University of Science and Technology
Members of the Chinese Academy of Engineering
Deaths from the COVID-19 pandemic in China
People from Zhenjiang